Madhvi Parekh (born 1942) is an Indian contemporary artist living in New Delhi.

Her work revolves around childhood memory, women's craft, folk art and Indian myths and traditional tales of Vedic and other cultures. Although her inspirations are traditional, her style is contemporary as she was greatly influenced by Paul Klee. While it represents folk art, it does not draw from any one specific folk tradition.

Early life 
Madhvi Parekh was born in the village of Sanjaya near Ahmedabad, Gujarat where her father was a Gandhian school teacher and postmaster.

In 1957, at the age of fifteen, she married Manu Parekh, an Indian artist who studied at the J J School of Art. They moved first to Ahmedabad, then Mumbai where she did a course in Montessori education. In 1964, they then moved to Kolkata where they lived to 1965 before moving to New Delhi.

Career 
Initially, Madhvi Parekh did not aspire to become an artist herself but her husband, Manu, inspired her to take up art. She started painting in the 1960s while pregnant with their first daughter, Manisha.  In 1968, Madhvi exhibited her work for the first time at the Birla Academy in Kolkata. One of her paintings was selected to be in the annual show of Lalit Kala Akademi and then purchased by the national institution helping to launch her career. In 1973 she had her first solo show at the Chemould Art Gallery, Kolkata. 

From 1987−1989, Madhvi organised and participated in the exhibition titled Through The Looking Glass with her contemporaries, the women artists Nalini Malani, Nilima Sheikh, and Arpita Singh. The exhibition, featuring works by all four artists, travelled to five non-commercial venues across India. Inspired by a meeting in 1979 with Nancy Spero, May Stevens and Ana Mendieta at the AIR Gallery in New York (the first all-female artists’ cooperative gallery in the US), Nalini Malani had planned to organize an exhibition entirely of works by women artists, which failed to materialize due to a lack of interest and support.  

In 2017 a retrospective of her work entitled The Curious Seeker was shown at DAG, Delhi. The exhibition traveled to DAG, Mubai in 2018 and DAG, New York in 2019.

Madhvi Parekh started painting by depicting memories of her childhood and fantasy. Her paintings are vivid and surreal. She started painting in traditional folk style and later gradually moved towards oil and acrylic on canvas and watercolor on paper, which allowed her the freedom to broaden her artistic imagination as well as find a language to express her views on women, children, urban and rural.

Her daughter, Manisha Parekh is also a well noted Indian artist.

Influences 
Madhvi Parekh's early works have been inspired by narratives and folk stories from her childhood spent in a rural part of India. Traditional floor designs of Rangoli made art a part of everyday household ritual for Madhvi, and this morphed in the first introduction to early forms of painting. In the initial days of their married life, artist-husband, Manu Parekh gifted Madhvi a book called Pedagogical Sketchbook by Paul Klee, a Swiss German artist  which formed an early influence on her style. Parekh's influences also include the Italian contemporary artist Francesco Clemente.

Beginning with many solos, Madhvi participated in notable group shows such as, Play Turkey and Yugoslavia in 1985, Watercolours by Four Women Artists, Bharat Bhavan, Bhopal in 1987 and Jehangir Art Gallery, Mumbai in 1987.

References

Further reading 
 Singh, Kishore, ed. (2017). Madhvi Parekh: The Curious Seeker , New Delhi: DAG Modern. ISBN 978-93-81217-65-8.

Women artists from Gujarat
Indian women painters
1942 births
Living people
Painters from Gujarat
20th-century Indian women artists
21st-century Indian women artists